Best Night Ever is a 2013 American found footage comedy film written and directed by Jason Friedberg and Aaron Seltzer and produced by Jason Blum, Friedberg and Seltzer. The film took place in Boston, Massachusetts and Las Vegas, Nevada.

Plot
Four young women have a series of wild and raucous adventures during a bachelorette party in Las Vegas.

Cast
 Desiree Hall as Claire
 Eddie Ritchard as Zoe
 Samantha Colburn as Leslie
 Crista Flanagan as Janet

Critical reception 
Best Night Ever was not screened in advance for critics. It was savaged by film critics. On Rotten Tomatoes, the film has an approval rating of 0% based on 15 reviews with an average rating of 2.59/10. Metacritic reports a weighted average of 17 out of 100 based on 8 critics, indicating "overwhelming dislike".

Ignatiy Vishnevetsky of The A.V. Club called it "a joyless patience-tester so inept it doesn't even know how to cheat its own found-footage gimmick", further saying "the movie has more awkward dead space than jokes".

References

External links
 

2013 films
Found footage films
American comedy films
Films produced by Jason Blum
Blumhouse Productions films
2013 comedy films
2010s English-language films
2010s American films